Yuyang Area, or Pinggu Town, is an area and a town situates in the southwest of Pinggu District, Beijing, China. It borders Wangxinzhuang Town and Xinggu Subdistrict to the north, Xiagezhuang Town to the east, Donggaocun Town to the south, Machangying and Daxingzhuang Towns to the west, and surrounds Binhe Subdistrict on three sides. According to the 2020 census, its population was 62,694.

The town was named Pinggu because of its location in a plain surrounded by mountains on the north, east and south. When it became an area in 2002, the namd Yuyang was given in order to distinguish it from the larger district.

History

Administrative divisions 
By the end of 2021, Yuyang Area consisted of 21 subdivisions, in which 8 were communities and 13 were villages. They are named in the following list:

See also 

 List of township-level divisions of Beijing

References 

Pinggu District
Towns in Beijing
Areas of Beijing